Bahrettinia is a genus of flies in the family Tachinidae.

Species
Bahrettinia arida (Reinhard, 1943)

Distribution
United States.

References

Diptera of North America
Dexiinae
Tachinidae genera
Monotypic Brachycera genera